Quantum Experiment using Satellite Technology  launched in 2017 by Raman Research Institute in February 2021 demonstrated Quantum communication for 50 m apart and on 19 March 2021 for 300 m apart inline of sight in Space Applications Centre in coordination with Indian Space Research Organisation ,Indian Institute of Science and Tata Institute of Fundamental Research,. India 's first project on satellite based long distance Quantum communication,

Technical specifications 

 Indigenously developed NAVIC receiver for time synchronization
 Gimbal mechanism system instead of large aperture telescope for optical alignment.
 Shared Quantum secure text.
 Shared image transmission.
 Quantum assisted two ways video conferencing at Space Applications Centre and Physical Research Laboratory
 It used robust and high brightness entangled photon source, used BBM92 protocol implementation NAVIC enabled snychronization polarization compensation technique.
 It is hack proof as it uses Quantum key distribution.
 It uses Quantum cryptography and carried out by Quantum information and computing (QuIC) lab .

References 

Satellites
Quantum computing
Indian Space Research Organisation